This is a list of notable United States politicians who have a research doctorate.

Federal government

Executive branch

Former presidents

Current and former cabinet members and senior administration officials

Supreme Court justices

Legislative branch

Current senators

Former senators

Current representatives

Former representatives

State governments

State executives

Current governors

Former governors

Former lieutenant governors

References

Doctorates